Maxim Alekseyevich Burov (born 5 June 1998) is a Russian freestyle skier. A three-time World Champion, he won back-to-back titles in individual aerials, in 2019 and 2021, becoming the first Russian and the fourth male aerial skier to do that. He participated at two Winter Olympics and competed in the men's aerials by representing Olympic Athletes from Russia in 2018 and Russian Olympic Committee in 2022.

His elder brother, Ilya Burov, is a fellow freestyle aerials skier and has competed at the 2014 Winter Olympics, 2018 Winter Olympics and in the 2022 Winter Olympics. The brothers competed at the men's aerials freestyle skiing event in the 2018 Winter Olympics, with Ilya winning a bronze medal in the event while Maxim Burov finished in 15th position. Four years later they competed at the men's aerials freestyle skiing event in the 2022 Winter Olympics, with Ilya winning a bronze medal again while Maxim finished in 16th position.

World Cup podiums

Individual podiums
 14 wins
 17 podiums

Team podiums
 3 wins
 5 podiums

Season titles
 3 titles

References

External links

1998 births
Living people
Russian male freestyle skiers
Freestyle skiers at the 2018 Winter Olympics
Freestyle skiers at the 2022 Winter Olympics
Sportspeople from Yaroslavl
Olympic freestyle skiers of Russia
Universiade gold medalists for Russia
Universiade bronze medalists for Russia
Universiade medalists in freestyle skiing
Competitors at the 2019 Winter Universiade